Crudia balachandrae is a species of plant in the family Fabaceae. It is endemic to Great Nicobar Island in the Nicobar Islands.

References

balachandrae
Flora of the Nicobar Islands
Vulnerable plants
Taxonomy articles created by Polbot